Jake Julian Barrington Meyer  (born 20 January 1984) is a British mountaineer and adventurer. He achieved fame by becoming the youngest Briton to climb Mount Everest in 2005, aged 21 years 4 months. In doing so, Meyer also became the youngest man in the world to complete the Seven Summits challenge. More recently in 2018 he summited K2, the second highest mountain in the world. He has taken part in over 30 expeditions around the world.

Early life 
From Tetbury in Gloucestershire, England, Meyer was educated at Beaudesert Park School, Hawtreys, Cheam School and Marlborough College, then embarked on the study of Environmental Geoscience at Bristol University, where he was also a member of Bristol University Officer Training Corps. He has since been commissioned into the Royal Wessex Yeomanry as an Armoured Troop Leader and has served in Afghanistan.

Meyer began climbing at 13. Aged 15, he saw in the new millennium with his father from the crater rim of his first summit, Kilimanjaro. At 18, he climbed Mount Elbrus in Southern Russia, Europe's highest peak. In 2002, he was awarded with a Winston Churchill Memorial Trust travelling fellowship to climb Elbrus (aged 18), Aconcagua (aged 18), Denali (aged 19) and Mount Kosciuszko (aged 19), the highest peaks in North and South America and Australia. He then climbed Mount Vinson, the highest peak in Antarctica, before attempting Everest.

Everest
Meyer ascended from the Tibetan side, via the North Col-North East Ridge route.  The climb started on 2 April 2005, reaching the summit on 4 June 2005.

He was accompanied by Diahanne Gilbert, the Scottish team leader, and two Sherpas, Mingma Nuru and Anil Bhattarai.

Meyer's climb was in aid of the Children's Wish Foundation.

Mountaineering/Adventures
Meyer is a self-confessed peak-bagger/Highpointer and enjoys collecting country highpoints around the world. Many of these are not considered technical challenges, or may not even count as a true mountain, however they often represent a logistical challenge, or a mini adventure to a country, region or area which he wouldn't otherwise travel to, and visit with family/friends.  To date this includes:
Europe: UK, Ireland, Spain, Malta, Netherlands, Belgium, Luxembourg, Russia
North America:USA, Mexico, Barbados
South America: Argentina, Chile, Venezuela, Ecuador
Asia: Nepal/China, Pakistan, Oman, Kuwait, UAE, Bahrain, Jordan, Saudi Arabia
Africa: Egypt; Morocco; Kenya; Tanzania; Lesotho, South Africa, Botswana, Eswatini (Swaziland), Mauritius 
Australasia: Mount Kosciuszko
Antarctica: Vinson Massif

Records
Meyer has broken and holds or has previously held several records:
Youngest Briton to climb Mount Everest (2005-held until 2006). His "youngest Briton to climb Mount Everest" record was broken in 2006 by Rob Gauntlett who was 19 at the time.
Youngest man in the world to have completed the Seven Summits (Bass Variant). Meyer was 'pipped at the post' to the title of "youngest person in the world" to climb the Seven Summits by 20-year-old American Danielle Fisher, who summitted three days earlier, taking the South Col route, but was able to claim being the youngest man in the world to complete the Seven Summits.
Youngest ascent of Mount Vinson (highest mountain in the Antarctic) (2004 - held for 8 days)
Youngest solo ascent of Aconcagua (highest mountain outside the Himalayas) (2002)
Tenth (and youngest) Briton to summit K2 2018. His successful summit was the culmination of 3 attempts over 9 years (2009, 2016 and 2018). At the time he was the seventh Briton to have survived summiting K2. Meyer used his 2016 and 2018 expeditions to raise money for Walking With The Wounded.  
Shortest time to visit the highest point in every county in the UK. 82 counties, metropolitan counties and unitary authorities in 7 days, 4 hours and 20 minutes (2008)
Shortest time to climb the highest peak in each of the 48 states of the Continental USA. The Freestyle Challenge was completed in 23 days 19 hours 31 minutes in 2006 as Meyer reached the summit of Mount Katahdin in Maine. The British team shaved nearly six days off the existing record of 29 days, previously held by American Ben Jones. Meyer's record held for nearly 9 years until it was broken by American's Josh and Lindsay Sanders in a time of 19 days, 7 hours and 37 minutes.

Personal life 
Jake married Saskia Stoop in 2013. They have three daughters: Ottalie (born 2014), Poppy (born 2016) and Sienna (born 2020). They currently live in Fernhurst, West Sussex. He is a full-time leadership development consultant for The Inspirational Development Group, a UK based global development consultancy. He was the first ambassador for the British watch maker Bremont, and is their longest serving ambassador.

Charity and youth work 
Meyer has often used his expeditions to raise money for charities which are close to his heart, especially military and youth charities. He is an ambassador for Walking With The Wounded, and has also fundraised for Help for Heroes and the ABF (Soldier's Charity). He is a keen supporter of the Duke of Edinburgh's Award Scheme, and has also supported the Prince's Trust, Make a Wish Foundation, Prince's Teaching Institute, the CAIRN Trust (Child Action in Rural Nepal), and Mercy Ships . He is a regular speaker at schools around the UK and has a Explorer Scout Group named after him (The Meyer Explorer Scouts in Dursley, Gloucestershire). 

Meyer was awarded the British Empire Medal (BEM) in the 2020 Birthday Honours for services to mountaineering, young people and charity.

References 

1984 births
Living people
English explorers
English mountain climbers
British summiters of Mount Everest
People educated at Marlborough College
Alumni of the University of Bristol
Summiters of the Seven Summits
British motivational speakers
People from Tetbury
People educated at Beaudesert Park School
Sportspeople from Gloucestershire
Royal Wessex Yeomanry officers
Recipients of the British Empire Medal